Cellana radiata (common name: the rayed wheel limpet), is a species of predatory sea snail, a marine gastropod mollusk in the family Nacellidae.

Subspecies
 Cellana radiata capensis (Gmelin, 1791)
 Cellana radiata radiata (Born, 1778)
 Cellana radiata cylindrica Gmelin, 1791: synonym of Cellana cylindrica (Gmelin, 1791)
 Cellana radiata enneagona  (L. A. Reeve, 1854) : synonym of Cellana enneagona (Reeve, 1854)
 Cellana radiata orientalis  (H. A. Pilsbry, 1891) : synonym of Cellana radiata (Born, 1778)

Description
The height of the flattened shell varies between 13 mm and 45 mm. The apex is slightly out of the middle and is often worn out. The shell has numerous, rather flat, granular ridges of varying height. The color of the shell is grayish white to dark brown, with the ribs somewhat darker. The interior is pale white and iridescent. The markings of the muscles contrast with a dark gray color.

Distribution
This species is distributed in the Indo-Pacific, mainly Australia and can be found on rocks in littoral and sublittoral areas.

References

 Nakano T. & Ozawa T. (2007). Worldwide phylogeography of limpets of the order Patellogastropoda: molecular, morphological and paleontological evidence. Journal of Molluscan Studies 73(1): 79–99

External links
 M. Balaparamesware, Studies on the growth of the limpet Cellana radiata (Born) (Gastropoda, Prosobranchia), Journal of Molluscan Studies, 1976, 42 (1), pp. 136-144

Nacellidae
Gastropods described in 1778